Francisco Clailson Mendes da Silva (born 16 March 1993) commonly known as Kaká Mendes, is a Brazilian footballer who plays for Al-Okhdood.

References

External links
 

1993 births
Living people
Brazilian footballers
Brazilian expatriate footballers
Association football midfielders
América Futebol Clube (RN) players
Associação Desportiva Cabofriense players
Boavista Sport Club players
Sampaio Corrêa Futebol e Esporte players
Al-Okhdood Club players
Campeonato Brasileiro Série D players
Saudi Second Division players
Saudi First Division League players
Expatriate footballers in Saudi Arabia
Brazilian expatriate sportspeople in Saudi Arabia
Sportspeople from Fortaleza